New River may refer to:

Waterways

Caribbean 
 Nuevo River (Puerto Rico)
 Rio Nuevo (Jamaica)

Europe 
 New River (Fens), a man-made watercourse in the English Fenlands
 New River (London), a man-made watercourse in Hertfordshire and London

North America 
 New River (Mexico–United States) (Rio Nuevo in Spanish), which flows from the Mexicali Valley in Baja California into the Salton Sea in California

 New River (Trinity River tributary), a tributary of the Trinity River in northern California
 New River (Broward County, Florida), a channel which drains the Everglades through Fort Lauderdale in South Florida
 New River (Carrabelle River tributary), a tributary of the Carrabelle River in Florida
 New River (Santa Fe River tributary), a tributary of the Santa Fe River in northern Florida
 New River (Hillsborough River tributary), a tributary of the Hillsborough River (Florida) in Hillsborough and Pasco Counties in Florida
 New River (Chattahoochee River tributary), in Georgia
 New River (Withlacoochee River tributary), in Georgia
 New River (Louisiana), in Ascension Parish
 New River (Michigan)
 New River (New Hampshire), a tributary of the Ellis River on Mount Washington
 New River (North Carolina), which flows into the Atlantic Ocean in southeastern North Carolina
 New River (Kanawha River tributary), a tributary of the Ohio River via the Kanawha River, in North Carolina, Virginia, and West Virginia
 New River (Oregon), in southwestern Oregon, parallels the Pacific Ocean between Coos Bay and Port Orford
 New River (South Carolina), which flows into the Atlantic Ocean in southeastern South Carolina near the Savannah River
 New River (Tennessee), a tributary of the Cumberland River in Tennessee

Oceania 
 New River / Kaimata in the West Coast region of New Zealand
 An alternative name for the Ōreti River in New Zealand, most commonly used for its estuary

South and Central America 
 New River (Belize), a river that flows north into Chetumal Bay
 New River (South America), claimed by Suriname and Guyana
 New River Triangle, the area of dispute

Other uses 
 New River, Arizona, a census-designated place in the Phoenix, Arizona metropolitan area
 Bradford County, Florida, named New River County from 1858 through 1861
 New River Tunnel, in Ft. Lauderdale, Florida
 Marine Corps Air Station New River, near Jacksonville, North Carolina
 New River Valley, in Virginia
 New River Community College, in Virginia
 New River Coalfield, in West Virginia
 New River Gorge Bridge, in West Virginia
 New River Gorge National River, protecting a portion of the river in West Virginia
 New River Trail State Park, in Virginia 
 New River (ward), London Borough of Hackney
 New River (album)

See also 
 

 New (disambiguation)
 Rio Nuevo (disambiguation), Spanish for 'New River'
 Xinhe (disambiguation), Chinese for 'New River' (新河)